The Journal of Aging and Health (JAH) is a medical journal covering aging published by SAGE Publications. It covers research on gerontology, including diet/nutrition, prevention, behaviors, health service utilization, longevity, and mortality. The editor-in-chief is Kyriakos S. Markides.

Abstracting and indexing 
The Journal of Aging and Health is abstracted and indexed in Scopus, PubMed, and the Social Sciences Citation Index. According to the Journal Citation Reports, its 2016 impact factor is 2.168, ranking it 24 out of 77 journals in the category "Health Policy & Services" and 12 out of 32 journals in the category "Gerontology".

References

External links 
 

SAGE Publishing academic journals
English-language journals
Gerontology journals
Publications established in 1989